La gazza ladra (The Thieving Magpie) is a melodramma or opera semiseria in two acts by Gioachino Rossini, with a libretto by Giovanni Gherardini based on La pie voleuse by Théodore Baudouin d'Aubigny and Louis-Charles Caigniez.
The Thieving Magpie is best known for the overture, which is musically notable for its use of snare drums. This memorable section in Rossini's overture evokes the image of the opera's main subject: a devilishly clever, thieving magpie.

Rossini wrote quickly, and La gazza ladra was no exception. A 19th-century biography quotes him as saying that the conductor of the premiere performance locked him in a room at the top of La Scala the day before the premiere with orders to complete the opera's still unfinished overture. He was under the guard of four stagehands whose job it was to toss each completed page out the window to the copyist below.

Performance history

The first performance of The Thieving Magpie was on 31 May 1817, at La Scala, Milan. In 1818, Rossini revised the opera for subsequent productions in Pesaro; and then in 1819 for the Teatro del Fondo, in Naples; in 1820 for the Teatro di San Carlo, in Naples; and in 1866 he revised the music for performance in Paris. The 1866 revision included embellishments and variations written specifically for Giuseppina Vitali, who was singing the role of Ninetta.  He revised the role again in 1867 with embellishments and cadenzas for Adelina Patti.

The first performance of The Thieving Magpie in England was at the King's Theatre, London, on 10 March 1821. A French-language opera-comique using the original title of the French source material (La pie voleuse) in a version translated by Castil-Blaze was premiered in Lille, France, on 15 October 1822. The French-language version's first performance in the United States was at the Théâtre d'Orléans, New Orleans, on 30 December 1824.

In 1941, Riccardo Zandonai composed a version of The Thieving Magpie for a revival of the opera in Pesaro. In 1979, Alberto Zedda edited Rossini's original composition of the opera for publication by the Fondazione Rossini. In 2013, the Bronx Opera of New York City performed an English-language version of La gazza ladra.

Roles

Synopsis

Act 1
 
At the house of Fabrizio Vingradito and his wife Lucia there is joy for the imminent return of their son Giannetto from the war. One of the servants, Ninetta, is in love with Giannetto and all want the two to marry, except Lucia, who blames Ninetta for the recent loss of a silver fork. Isacco, a local peddler, visits and asks about Ninetta, but Pippo, Fabrizio's manservant, sends him away. Giannetto arrives and goes inside with Lucia while Ninetta prepares for the party. Once they have gone, Ninetta's father, Fernando Villabella, arrives, also from the war. However, he was sentenced to death after fighting with his captain and is now a deserter. He asks his daughter to sell two pieces of family silver to go towards his expenses while he is on the run. The Mayor arrives with intent on seducing Ninetta, and she claims that her father is just some vagrant. The Mayor's assistant delivers the arrest warrant for a deserter (Fernando), but as the Mayor has forgotten his reading glasses, Ninetta is asked to read the warrant, and makes up a description of someone totally unlike her father. The Mayor continues to force his attentions on Ninetta, at which Fernando almost reveals himself in anger. The three leave, and a magpie flies down and steals one of Lucia's silver spoons.

Isacco passes by again, and Ninetta sells him the silver her father had entrusted to her. Giannetto and others return, and Lucia notices that a spoon is missing. The Mayor starts an immediate investigation, stating the draconian penalty for domestic theft: death. Lucia and the Mayor accuse Ninetta, who in her distress drops the money she had exchanged from Isacco. The peddler is brought back and reports that he has already sold the spoon, but he recalls the inscription "F.V.", initials shared by Fabrizio and Fernando. The stunned Ninetta, desperate to protect her father, is unable to refute the accusations, and the Mayor orders her arrest.

Act 2
Antonio, the prison warder, takes pity on Ninetta and says that he will get a message to Pippo and let Giannetto visit her. Ninetta convinces Giannetto that she is innocent. The Mayor now arrives and tells Ninetta that if she accepts his advances he will get her freed – she replies that she would rather die. The Mayor is called away, but Antonio has heard all and offers to help Ninetta any way he can. Ninetta asks Pippo to sell a gold cross and put some money for her father in an agreed hiding place – a chestnut tree. Ninetta is brought to trial, found guilty, and condemned to death. Fernando rushes to the court to save his daughter's life, but is too late; he too is sent to prison.

Ernesto, a military friend of Fernando, bursts in looking for the Mayor and holding a royal pardon for Ninetta's father. Pippo shows him the way and is given a silver coin for helping, but the magpie snatches it and flies up to the tower. Pippo and Antonio pursue the thief.

Ninetta is taken to the scaffold and makes her final speech to the crowd. From the tower, Pippo and Antonio cry out that they have found Lucia's silver in the magpie's nest and they ring the bells. The crowd hear their words and hope to save Ninetta, but shots ring out and they conclude that they are too late. However, Ninetta appears walking down the hill – the shots were mere rejoicing. Ninetta celebrates with her companions but is worried about her father. He then appears with Ernesto and all – except the Mayor – enjoy a happy ending.

Arias

The most famous aria in the opera is probably Ninetta's prayer "Deh, tu reggi in tal momento". The soprano cavatina "Di piacer mi balza il cor" and the tenor cavatina "Vieni fra queste braccia" (the cabaletta for the duet between Arturo and Elvira from Bellini's I Puritani starts with exactly the same words) are two examples of Rossini's brilliant vocal writing.

Act One
 Cavatina – Di piacer mi balza il cor (Ninetta)
 Cavatina – Stringhe e ferri – Isacco
 Cavatina – Vieni fra queste braccia – Gianetto
 Brindisi – Tocchiamo, Beviamo – Pippo
 Duetto – Come frenare il pianto – Ninetta e Fernando
 Cavatina – Il mio piano è preparato – Podestà
 Terzetto – Oh Nume benefico

Act Two
 Duetto – Forse un dì conoscerete – Ninetta e Giannetto
 Aria – Si per voi, pupille amate – Podestà
 Duetto – Ebben, per mia memoria – Ninetto e Pippo
 Aria – Accusato di furto – Fernando
 Aria – A questo seno – Lucia
 Preghiera – Deh tu reggi in tal momento – Ninetta

Recordings

Film
An animated short film called La gazza ladra was made in 1964 by Giulio Gianini and Emanuele Luzzati using the overture as the soundtrack, with motion synchronized to the music.  It was constructed by moving cutouts from frame to frame to illustrate a story of a thieving magpie, centered on the magpie, unlike in the opera.  In 1965 the film was nominated for an Academy Award and won the first Grand Prix of the Melbourne International Film Festival.

References
Notes

Sources
Gossett, Philip; Brauner, Patricia (2001), " La gazza ladra" in Holden, Amanda (ed.), The New Penguin Opera Guide, New York: Penguin Putnam. 
Osborne, Charles (1994), The Bel Canto Operas of Rossini, Donizetti, and Bellini, London: Methuen; Portland, Oregon: Amadeus Press.  
Osborne, Richard (1998), "La gazza ladra", in Stanley Sadie  (Ed.),  The New Grove Dictionary of Opera, Vol. Two.  London: Macmillan Publishers, Inc.   
Osborne, Richard (1990), Rossini, Ithaca, New York: Northeastern University Press. 
Osborne, Richard (1998), "La gazza ladra", in Stanley Sadie, (Ed.),  The New Grove Dictionary of Opera, Vol. XXX. pp. XXX London: Macmillan Publishers, Inc.   
 Warrack, John; West, Ewan (1992). The Oxford Dictionary of Opera. Oxford: Oxford University Press. .

External links
La pie voleuse opera en trois actes, by Gioacchino Rossini, Castil-Blaze, Giovanni Gherardini (published by E.J. Coale, 1831)
La gazza ladra by Gioacchino Rossini, Giovanni Gherardini, Aubigny, Caigniez (Louis-Charles) (published by Elliott, 1833)
 Libretto : }
 La Fenice libretto and programme   (PDF)
 La gazza ladra : melodramma in due atti, 1870 publication, digitized by BYU on archive.org

Operas by Gioachino Rossini
Italian-language operas
Opera semiseria
1817 operas
Operas
Opera world premieres at La Scala
Operas based on plays